Special Olympics Great Britain (SOGB) is a sporting organisation for children and adults with intellectual disabilities that operates in England, Scotland and Wales. It is part of the global Special Olympics movement. Great Britain is represented at the Special Olympics World Games and the Special Olympics Great Britain National Games are held on a four year cycle.

History
Initially known as Special Olympics UK, it was founded in 1978 by Chris Maloney MBE and at the time, was one of the first European programmes of the international Special Olympics movement. Special Olympics GB was established on 8 August 1979, the year Great Britain made its début at the Special Olympics World Games in Brockport, United States.

Organisation 
Special Olympics GB creates opportunities for children and adults with learning (intellectual) disabilities to take part in various sports training and competition year-round.

Special Olympics is often confused with the Paralympics, which is for elite athletes with physical and/or intellectual disabilities.

To be eligible to take part in the Special Olympics GB programmes, participants would have to have an IQ of 75 and below. There are currently 140 Special Olympics clubs in Great Britain, run by over 4,000 volunteers, and involving 10,000 athletes who benefit from taking regular sport training and competitions programmes.

Special Olympics GB has a charitable status and has been receiving donations and funding from individuals as well as corporate partners. National Grid, Coca-Cola GB, ABB and Lions Clubs International are some of the long-term official partners of the charity.

Special Olympic GB Ambassadors from the world of sports and entertainment help to raise funds and build awareness of the charity's work throughout Great Britain.

Special Olympics GB includes former Southampton football manager Lawrie McMenemy, Olympic Champion athlete Darren Campbell, former NBA basketball legend John Amaechi, TV beauty and style guru Armand Beasley.

Special Olympics GB offers 28 different individual and team sports that provide meaningful training and competition opportunities for people with intellectual (learning) disabilities.

Special Olympics GB has an extensive network of clubs operating in 19 regions throughout England, Scotland and Wales.

All the clubs and competitions are run solely by an army of dedicated volunteers.

Great Britain at the Special Olympics World Games

Athletes representing Great Britain have participated in the both the summer and winter editions of the Special Olympics World Games.

Summer

Source:

Winter

Source:

Special Olympics Great Britain National Games
The Special Olympics Great Britain National Games are held every four years. The 2021 edition was postponed as a result of the global Covid-19 pandemic and a venue and dates are to be determined.

Editions

Teams
Athletes compete as part of twelve regional teams; East Midlands, East of England, Greater London, North West England, Northern England, Scotland, South East England, South West England, Southern England, Wales, West Midlands, Yorkshire and the Humber.

References

External links
 Official website

Special Olympics
Sports organisations of the United Kingdom
Parasports organizations
Disability organisations based in the United Kingdom
1978 establishments in the United Kingdom
Sports organizations established in 1978